Estadio Martín Torres is a multi-use stadium in Asunción, Paraguay.  It is currently used mostly for football matches and is the home stadium of Sportivo Trinidense.  The stadium holds 3,000 people and opened in 1957.

Multi-purpose stadiums in Paraguay
Football venues in Asunción
Sports venues in Asunción
Sports venues completed in 1957